Surrey Heath is a local government district with borough status in Surrey, England.  Its council is based in Camberley.  Much of the area is within the Metropolitan Green Belt.

History

The district was formed on 1 April 1974 under the Local Government Act 1972, as a merger of Frimley and Camberley Urban District, and Bagshot Rural District.
The Borough acquired its name because it includes extensive areas of heath and woodland including Chobham Common and Lightwater Country Park.

Bagshot Rural District
Bagshot Rural District formed the largest part of Surrey Heath. The villages and hamlets in Bagshot rural district comprised Lightwater, Bagshot, Windlesham, Chobham including West End and Bisley.

The motto for the district was Festina Prudenter granted on 20 July 1960.
 
On the crest, the gold and white background was from the arms of Chertsey Abbey, which owned and is connected with the history of much of the district - Bagshot was included in a grant to the Abbey as early as 933. The stag's head on the crest refers to Bagshot Park, a royal demesne since Norman times and hunting ground of the Stuart kings, and also to the fact that much of the area was formerly part of Windsor Forest. The grenade on the crest refers to the area's military associations, in particular the former military camp at Chobham and the lion recalls the area's royal links. The fir cones and mound of heathland refers to Bagshot Heath, and the falcon is derived from the supporters of the Earls of Onslow.

The Surrey Heath community have been recognised for one of the most organised volunteer initiatives to the COVID-19 outbreak through their Surrey Heath Prepared organisation.

Governance
The local area is governed by Surrey Heath Borough Council with councillors' affiliations as follows: 

The 2 May 2019 borough elections left the Conservative party with a majority of one, their smallest ever, following a number of by elections and defections they are now in minority administration.

For detailed election results, see Surrey Heath Borough Council elections.

In 2014, the British Election Study named Surrey Heath as the most right-wing constituency in the country.

Parish Councils 
The parish council elections resulted in 7 Independent councillors for Bisley Parish council and 13 Conservative, 3 Green, 2 Independent and 1 Liberal Democrat for Windlesham Parish Council.

Parish councils in Surrey Heath are in Bisley with the chairman being Cllr Barry Woodhead; Chobham with the chairman being Cllr Les Coombs; West End with the chairman being Cllr David Elliott and Windlesham (which includes Lightwater and Bagshot) where the chairman is Cllr Keith Hand.

Council financial management 
In 2016 the Conservative-led council approved the £110 million purchase of the Square Shopping centre in Camberley, through the purchase of an offshore trust based in Jersey (a condition of the vendor).  Although Surrey Heath Borough Council owns the trust, it has no direct control over the asset and depends on unknown trustees to manage the assets of the trust.

In 2019, the council's accounts report property investment assets valued at £83 million, a reported loss of £27 million.

Reports involving Karen Whelan, former Chief Executive 
In January 2019, the then Chief Executive, Karen Whelan, had had her base salary increased from £128,000 by a pay rise of £15,000 back dated to April 2017 with the business case and payroll instruction signed by the then council leader taking her pay for the year to £158,000, this rose to £197,000 when pension contributions were taken into account.

The increase had become subject to an independent investigation

In August 2019, Private Eye reported Ms Gibson had given an "unlawful £15,000 p.a. pay increase to Ms Whelan in 2019, backdated to April 2017".  The additional payment was reportedly due to the council Chief Executive managing the council's commercial property portfolio.

In October 2019, Ms Whelan was reported to have been placed on special leave, despite speculation that she had been suspended.

In January 2020, the council received a report from an independent investigation into the payments made to Ms Whelan, prepared by law firm Browne Jacobson.  Citing undisclosed ongoing matters, Browne Jacobson said the council should not release the report, "either in full or in part".  At that time there was no report of Karen Whelan having left the pay of the council.

A heavily redacted version of the investigation report was subsequently released, which Private Eye magazine reported in May 2020 "clearly stated the payments [to Ms Whelan] were "unlawful either for want of [Ms Gibson's] authority ... or because the relevant procedural requirements were not followed"".  The article also reported "Whelan enjoyed stays in two luxury hotels" which the Browne Jacobson investigation described as "in each case ... outwith the council's policy on overnight accommodation".  The article continued "Whelan had told her PA to put her gift and hospitality entries in a separate log from that of other officers" with the Browne Jacobson report noting "It is unclear how inspection would occur if the existence of the separate log was unknown".

Local residents started a petition calling on the council to release the non-redacted version of the independent investigation report to the police.

Whelan qualified as a solicitor on 4 January 1994.

Whelan resigned from her position at the council in 2020, having worked there since 2005 including roles as its Monitoring officer and as an in-house solicitor, serving as CEO since 2010.

Vote of no confidence in council leader (2020) 
In January 2020, Conservative and council leader Richard Brooks resigned along with deputy leader Charlotte Morley following a unanimous vote of no confidence in the leader by the Conservative council group. Alan McClafferty was elected as new Conservative leader and council leader, who went on to sack a number of Conservative front benchers.

Councillor's court attendance for non-payment of council tax 
In June 2016 Conservative Councillor Daniel Robert Adams attended court for non-payment of council tax. In the same financial year he received two allowances (a basic and a special allowance) totalling £6400.40 from Surrey Heath Council.

Revisions to wiki from Surrey Heath Borough Council IP address 

On 3 February 2020 an individual from a Surrey Heath Borough Council Internet connection edited the Surrey Heath Wikipedia page and removed substantial amounts of independently cited facts about the council, the source IP address resolves to a Surrey Heath Council Internal system.

COVID-19 Vulnerability and Recovery 
In November 2020, the MJ reported that Grant Thornton have privately drawn up COVID-19 vulnerability and recovery indices for the Society of District Council Treasurers.

Geography
The area forms the heart of the heath that spans Esher, Oxshott, Weybridge, Wisley, all around Woking, Brookwood, Deepcut, Pirbright, Frimley, Lightwater, Camberley, Chobham Common, Virginia Water and Ottershaw. It is made up of naturally wet, very acid sandy and loamy soil, which is just 1.9% of English soil and 0.2% of Welsh soil, which gives rise to pines and coniferous landscapes, such as pioneered at Wentworth and Foxhills estate (now spa, hotel, restaurant and golf club) by pro-American independence statesman Charles James Fox. In geology it gives rise to the name, Bagshot Formation.

The western section of the district is largely urbanised, with heaths nonetheless providing substantial green buffer around Camberley, Lightwater, Deepcut, Frimley, Frimley Green and Mytchett.  The east of the district is less urbanised, and contains Surrey Heath's four civil parishes:
Bisley
Chobham (includes Castle Green and Mimbridge)
West End
Windlesham (contains also Bagshot, Lightwater and Valley End).

Within the borough there are five Sites of Special Scientific Interest, four of which are part of the Thames Basin Heaths Special Protection Area of European Importance as a habitat for certain endangered bird species; these make up some of the six Wildlife Reserves managed by Surrey Wildlife Trust in Surrey Heath.

Notable people
 Simone Ashley, actress known for her role in Netflix series Bridgerton, was born in Camberley.
 Steve Backshall, naturalist and television presenter, best known for the BBC wildlife documentary series, Deadly..., was born in Bagshot.
 Carl Fletcher, football player and Plymouth Argyle F.C and Wales national football team captain, was born in Camberley.
Alan "Howling Laud" Hope, leader of the Official Monster Raving Loony Party, was born in Mytchett.
The Duke and Duchess of Edinburgh  live at Bagshot Park with their family.

Twinning
Surrey Heath is twinned with Sucy-en-Brie, France, and Bietigheim-Bissingen, Germany.

Energy policy

In May 2006, a report commissioned by British Gas showed that housing in Surrey Heath produced the 3rd highest average carbon emissions in the country at an average of 7,477 kg of carbon dioxide per dwelling.

Opinion poll
Surrey Heath was voted the 6th best place to live in Channel 4's 2007 Location, Location, Location 'best and worst' survey.

References

External links
Chobham Common
Lightwater Country Park
Surrey Heath Borough Council
Surrey County Council local pages
Surrey Heath Local History Club

 
Non-metropolitan districts of Surrey
Boroughs in England